Tolna macrosema is a species of moth of the family Erebidae.

Distribution
It is found in  Ghana and South Africa

References

Catocalinae
Insects of West Africa
Moths of Africa
Moths described in 1913